Eucalyptus tricarpa, commonly known as red ironbark or mugga ironbark, is a species of tree that is endemic to south-eastern Australia. It has thick, rough ironbark on the trunk and branches, lance-shaped adult leaves, flower buds usually in groups of three, white flowers and cylindrical or spherical fruit.

Description
It has thick rough, reddish brown to black ironbark on the trunk and branches. Flowring occurs from February to November and the flowers are white or pale pink.

Taxonomy and naming
The red ironbark was first formally described in 1962 by Lawrie Johnson who gave it the name Eucalyptus sideroxylon subsp. tricarpa and published the description in Contributions from the New South Wales National Herbarium. In 1991, Johnson and Ken Hill raised the subspecies to species level as E. tricarpa. The specific epithet (tricarpa) is from ancient Greek words meaning "three" and "fruit".

In 2004, Kevin James Rule described two subspecies and the names are accepted by the Australian Plant Census:
 Eucalyptus tricarpa subsp. decora Rule has pruinose seedlings, branchlets, and flower buds; 
 Eucalyptus tricarpa (L.A.S.Johnson) L.A.S.Johnson & K.D.Hill subsp. tricarpa has no parts that are pruinose.

Distribution and habitat
Eucalyptus tricarpa grows in forest and woodland in coastal south from Araluen in New South Wales and is common in the goldfields near Bendigo, near Anglesea and in coastal and near-coastal areas of Gippsland. Subspecies decora occurs in open woodland around St Arnaud in Victoria.

Gallery

See also 
 List of Eucalyptus species

References

Flora of New South Wales
Flora of Victoria (Australia)
Trees of Australia
tricarpa
Myrtales of Australia
Plants described in 1962